Malozhma is a rural locality (a settlement) in Pokrovskoye Rural Settlement of Onezhsky District, Arkhangelsk Oblast, Russia. The population was 368 as of 2010.

Geography 
It is located on the Tamitsa River, 35 km north of Onega (the district's administrative centre) by road. Onega is the nearest rural locality.

References 

Rural localities in Onezhsky District